Adolfo Humberto Menéndez Cortéz (born 13 April 1970 in Santa Ana, El Salvador) is a retired Salvadoran footballer who played as a goalkeeper.

Club career
Nicknamed Fito, Menéndez came through at San Luis and San Rafael and made his debut in Primera División de Fútbol de El Salvador with Isidro Metapán in 1989, before joining FAS for a lengthy and successful spell during the 1990s. He won three league titles with FAS. In 2000, he returned to Isidro Metapán only to return to FAS, after a stint at Once Municipal, with whom he won the Apertura 2006.

International career
Menéndez made his debut for El Salvador in a June 1994 friendly match against Brazil and has earned a total of 4 caps, scoring no goals. He has represented his country at the 1995 UNCAF Nations Cup 

His final international match was an October 1999 CONCACAF Gold Cup qualification match against Cuba.

Retirement
After retiring as a player, Menéndez was shortly caretaker-manager of FAS and currently works as goalkeeping coach at the club. In June 2011, Ménendez was one of the first to be heard in a legal case about possible selling of matches in 2010.

Honours
Primera División de Fútbol de El Salvador: 4
 1994, 1995, 1996, Apertura 2006

References

External links

Profile - CD FAS

1970 births
Living people
Sportspeople from Santa Ana, El Salvador
Association football goalkeepers
Salvadoran footballers
El Salvador international footballers
1995 UNCAF Nations Cup players
A.D. Isidro Metapán footballers
C.D. FAS footballers
Once Municipal footballers